The World Tonight is a Philippine television English-language late-night newscast broadcast by Kapamilya Channel and ANC. It was formerly the English language late-night newscast of ABS-CBN from November 21, 1966, to September 22, 1972, and was originally anchored by Angelo Castro Jr., Loren Legarda and Tina Monzon-Palma from September 15, 1986, to August 13, 1999. The newscast is now anchored by Tony Velasquez and Pia Gutierrez on weeknights and Stanley Palisada on Saturdays. It airs from Monday to Saturday at 9:00 pm on ANC and every weeknight at 10:45 pm on the Kapamilya Channel. It also airs worldwide via TFC.

The World Tonight holds the record as the longest-running English newscast on Philippine television after the October 2012 ending of RPN's NewsWatch due to the retrenchment of 200 employees amid the network's privatization, although this is disputed since this did not air from 1972 to 1986 due to ABS-CBN's closure because of the country's declaration of martial law.

Airing history

The early years (1966–72)
The World Tonight premiered on November 21, 1966, at 8:30pm on ABS-CBN's DZXL-TV Channel 9 as the network's answer to ABC's Big News, The News with Uncle Bob on RBS, and later, NewsWatch on KBS. The World Tonight became one of the first Philippine television newscasts to broadcast in color. Co-anchoring the newscast were Hal Bowie, a veteran announcer from ABS-CBN radio, and Henry Halasan, a former ABS-CBN Cebu talent who was transferred to the network's main offices in Manila as a sales executive. Bowie, who was in his late 50s when the newscast first aired, later bowed out of the newscast due to health reasons and concentrated instead on producing news reports for the network. This left Halasan as main anchorman of the program.

The program was transferred to its sister station, DZAQ-TV Channel 3 on the 10:00pm time slot a year later. This happened when Channel 9 premiered the evening news program called Newsbreak in March 1967 at 9:00pm with Bong Lapira, who transferred from rival newscast Big News on ABC 5. The newscast continued after Channel 3 moved to the present Channel 2 and Channel 9 moved to Channel 4 for Metro Manila in 1969 until ABS-CBN's closure by the Marcos government during the declaration of martial law on September 22, 1972, with his sign Proclamation No. 1081.

The roster of field reporters for the newscast in its pre-Martial Law days included Orly Mercado, Jun Bautista, Antonio Seva, Tony Lozano, Boo Chanco, Philip Pigao, Lito Tacujan and Danny Hernandez.

Revival; Legarda-Castro era
The World Tonight returned on September 15, 1986, coinciding with the reopening of ABS-CBN after the People Power Revolution. It was anchored by Larry Ng (an ABS-CBN executive during the pre-Martial Law era), Angelo Castro Jr. (then the network's news director) and Loren Legarda who came from anchoring rival newscast NewsWatch on RPN with Harry Gasser. Ng left the newscast after a while, and was replaced by Korina Sanchez. However, she eventually left the newscast to concentrate on hosting the morning show Magandang Umaga (later Magandang Umaga Po), leaving Castro, Legarda, and Amy Godinez (who left in 1991) as main anchors. On May 4, 1992, Ces Oreña-Drilon (or Cathy Yap-Yang for Business), and Dyan Castillejo (for Sports) joined the program as segment anchors. Sanchez returned as an anchor but only on Saturdays along with Castro (or Bon Vibar as his substitute), Drilon, Castillejo with additional segments by Angelique Lazo (entertainment). It was replaced by The Weekend News in 1996.

Transition into cable; start of Castro-Palma era
The World Tonight began to simulcast on the network's cable news channel Sarimanok News Network launched on May 1, 1996, even it was still airing on ABS-CBN.

On February 2, 1998, Tina Monzon-Palma replaced Loren Legarda and joined Angelo Castro Jr. to the newscast when Legarda ran and later won as the top senator in the elections. Palma used to anchor rival newscasts GMA Headline News (on GMA Network) from 1986 until 1992 and The Big News (on the reopened ABC, now TV5) from 1992 to 1997. Loren Legarda made her final broadcast on the newscast on January 30, 1998.

However, in early 1999, the ratings of English late-night newscasts including The World Tonight started to decline when rival GMA introduced Filipino language late-night news with the relaunch of GMA Network News, anchored by Mike Enriquez and Vicky Morales; it debuted as an English newscast in 1992 and switched to Filipino with the relaunch, surging ahead of the ratings game in the process.

The World Tonight made its final broadcast on ABS-CBN on August 13, 1999. It was then replaced by the network's first Filipino-language late-night newscast, Pulso: Aksyon Balita anchored by Korina Sanchez and Ted Failon. The show competed with Frontpage: Ulat ni Mel Tiangco, which replaced GMA Network News on August 23, 1999.

ABS-CBN News Channel years (1999–present)
Two months later, The World Tonight premiered solely on the network's 24-hour ABS-CBN News Channel (ANC) on October 11, 1999, due to the channel's relaunch. Angelo Castro Jr. and Tina Monzon-Palma still remained as anchors at that time. The program continues to be one of the channel's flagship newscasts.

On March 12, 2001, as part of the major programming changes of ABS-CBN, The World Tonight relaunched to its graphics along with other ANC and ABS-CBN newscasts.

Castro retired as a news anchor in September 2009, as Palma went solo. However, he later returned on November 7, 2011, on a sporadic basis until December 26 of that year. He died on April 5, 2012, of lung cancer at the age of 67.

Revitalization (2015–present)
On January 12, 2015, 3 days before the Philippine visit of Pope Francis, The World Tonight reformatted as part of the "internationalization" of the ABS-CBN News Channel. It moved to an earlier timeslot at 9:00pm and expanded into a 1-hour newscast to compete with State of the Nation of then GMA News TV (now GTV) and CNN Philippines Nightly News of CNN Philippines, among other newscasts on the timeslot. New segments & reports with original content were also aired during the launching day.

On November 21, 2016, The World Tonight celebrated its 50th anniversary. Also this year, ANC marked its 20th anniversary. As part of the celebration of the two important milestones for the channel, an ANC X event was held at 8 Rockwell on December 7, 2016, which was attended by ABS-CBN executives, past and present anchors of The World Tonight and ANC, and prominent members of the business community. A documentary on the history of "The World Tonight" was aired on ANC on December 30, 2016.

On March 30, 2017, Palma took a sabbatical leave and Tony Velasquez temporarily took over as the program's main anchor. On January 29, 2018, Palma returned to the newscast after the leave, making her and Velasquez as the main anchors of the program.

It's Airs Monday - Saturday at 9:00 pm.

On May 18, 2020, Palma and Velasquez returned to anchor the newscast after 2 months of hiatus in lieu of ANC and DZMM's special coverage on the COVID-19 pandemic. Like TV Patrol and the other programs airing on ANC and Teleradyo, the newscast began to livestream online in their Facebook and YouTube channels.

Kapamilya Channel (2020–present)
On July 27, 2020, The World Tonight started its broadcast on ABS-CBN's replacement channel, Kapamilya Channel, replacing Bandila. This marks the newscast's indirect return on its original network as part of the Primetime Bida programming block after 21 years. It's also one of the few English-language programs on this channel.

In December 2020, main anchor Tina Monzon Palma left the newscast citing to a new public affairs program starting in June 2021. Co-Anchor Tony Velasquez replaced him as a Main Anchor.

On January 4, 2021, ANC head Nadia Trinidad announced on Twitter that it will relaunch The World Tonight with Tony Velasquez and Karen Davila (replacing Palma after 22 years in the anchor desk), while retaining the OBB, title card, theme music and other graphics including the lower third (a maroon-used color introduced in November 2020) and the news ticker graphics currently used by the channel. However, the newscast is airing live from ABS-CBN's Studio 7 (which is also used to air ABS-CBN's flagship news program TV Patrol and was their original studio during their ABS-CBN days). As Palma "has retired from the daily grind", Trinidad said that she will have her own upcoming public affairs program launching "soon", which later debuted as Tina Monzon-Palma Reports in May 2021.

On October 8, 2021, ABS-CBN News announced that Davila would return to TV Patrol on October 11, replacing Noli de Castro. Senior news reporter Pia Gutierrez took over her role for the newscast on the same day. The latter anchor returned to the said newscast on January 9, 2023 as the fourth main anchor.

From March 25 to April 7, 2022, The World Tonight temporarily suspended its delayed airing on Kapamilya Channel due to the special program of ABS-CBN News Harapan 2022. It continued to broadcast on ANC.

Anchors

Weekday

 Tony Velasquez (2015–present; then segment anchor for "Metro Wrap", "World Focus", "7,107", and "In Business")
 Pia Gutierrez (2021–present)

Weekend
 Stanley Palisada (Saturday anchor)

Segment hosts
 Michelle Ong (segment anchor for "In Business")

Former
 Hal Bowie (1966–1967)
 Henry Halasan (1966–1972)
 Angelo Castro Jr.† (1986–2009; 2011)
 Loren Legarda (1986–1998)
 Larry Ng (1986, relief anchor 1987–1990)
 Ces Oreña-Drilon (business anchor and occasional relief anchor for Legarda/Palma, 1992–1999)
 Cathy Yap-Yang (alternate business anchor, 1992–1999; main business anchor, 2015–2017)
 Daphne Oseña-Paez (weatherwoman, 1996–1999)
 TJ Manotoc (2015–2017; segment anchor for "In the Zone", now an ABS-CBN North American Bureau Chief)
 Coco Alcuaz (2015; segment anchor for "In Business")
 Amy Godinez-Cuenco (1989–1991)
 Korina Sanchez (weekday anchor, 1986; Saturday/Sunday Edition anchor, 1987–1995)
 Bon Vibar (alternate Saturday/Sunday Edition anchor for Castro, 1987–1996, relief anchor for Castro Jr. 1986–1996)
 Angelique Lazo (Saturday/Sunday entertainment anchor, 1987–1995)
 Frankie Evangelista† (relief anchor for Castro Jr., 1994–1999)
 Tina Monzon-Palma (1998–2017; 2018–2021)
 Teodoro Locsin Jr. (2011–2017) (segment anchor for "Teditorial")
 Marie Lozano (2015–2016; segment anchor for "Scene")
 Warren de Guzman (2015–2016; segment anchor for "Business")
 Dyan Castillejo (1992–1999; 2015–2016, segment anchor for "In the Zone")
 Gigi Grande (alternate weatherwoman, 1996–1999; 2015–2019, Saturday anchor) 
 Ron Cruz (2013–2020; Sunday anchor)
 Karen Davila (2021)

Segments
TWT Report
In Business
Metro Wrap
World Focus
7,107
In The Zone/Gametime
Scene
Final Word Tonight

See also
 List of programs broadcast by ABS-CBN
 List of programs shown on the ABS-CBN News Channel
 List of programs broadcast by Kapamilya Channel

References

External links
The World Tonight at Telebisyon.net

1960s Philippine television series
1970s Philippine television series
1980s Philippine television series
1990s Philippine television series
2000s Philippine television series
2010s Philippine television series
2020s Philippine television series
1966 Philippine television series debuts
1972 Philippine television series endings
1986 Philippine television series debuts
ABS-CBN news shows
ABS-CBN original programming
ABS-CBN News Channel original programming
English-language television shows
Philippine television news shows